Blessed Benefit is a 2016 internationally co-produced drama film directed by Mahmoud al Massad. It was selected to be screened in the Discovery section at the 2016 Toronto International Film Festival.

Cast
 Mahmoud al Massad as Ibrahim
 Odai Hijazi as Ahmad's Cousin
 Ahmad Thaher as Ahmad

References

External links
 

2016 films
2016 drama films
2016 comedy films
2010s Arabic-language films
2010s prison films
Jordanian drama films
German drama films
Dutch drama films
2010s German films